Kirk Mee (born March 5, 1939) is a former American football and baseball player and coach.  He was the head football coach at Defiance College in Defiance, Ohio from 1964 to 1966 and Earlham College in Richmond, Indiana from 1972 to 1973, compiling a career college football coaching record of 21–22–1.

Mee served in several coaching roles with the Washington Redskins of the National Football League (NFL) and after serving as an assistant football coach at the University of Wisconsin–Madison from 1967 to 1969.

Head coaching record

Football

References

1939 births
Living people
Defiance Yellow Jackets baseball coaches
Defiance Yellow Jackets football coaches
Earlham Quakers baseball coaches
Earlham Quakers football coaches
Ohio Bobcats football coaches
Wilmington Quakers baseball players
Wilmington Quakers football players
Wisconsin Badgers football coaches
Washington Redskins coaches
Washington Redskins executives
Washington Redskins scouts
College men's track and field athletes in the United States
People from Hamilton, Ohio
Players of American football from Ohio
Wilmington Quakers athletes